Eudociminus mannerheimii, the cypress weevil, is a species of pine weevil in the beetle family Curculionidae.

References

Further reading

 
 

 

Molytinae
Articles created by Qbugbot
Beetles described in 1936